Riccardo Moreo (born 24 February 1996) is an Italian football player who plays as a forward for Roma City.

Club career
He made his Serie C debut for AlbinoLeffe on 11 October 2014 in a game against FeralpiSalò.

On 15 July 2019, he signed a 3-year contract with Cosenza.

On 2 September 2019, he joined Monopoli on loan. On 5 October 2020, he was loaned to Lucchese. On 1 February 2021, he moved on a new loan to Novara.

On 27 August 2021, he went to Pergolettese on permanent basis.

On 20 July 2022, Moreo signed with Pro Sesto. His contract with Pro Sesto was terminated by mutual consent on 31 January 2023, and he joined Roma City in Serie D.

References

External links
 

1996 births
Living people
Footballers from Milan
Italian footballers
Association football forwards
Serie B players
Serie C players
Serie D players
U.C. AlbinoLeffe players
S.S. Akragas Città dei Templi players
A.C. Prato players
Cosenza Calcio players
S.S. Monopoli 1966 players
S.S.D. Lucchese 1905 players
Novara F.C. players
U.S. Pergolettese 1932 players
S.S.D. Pro Sesto players
A.S.D. Roma City F.C. players